In the 2022–23 season, Al Sadd SC is competing in the Qatar Stars League for the 50th season, as well as the Emir of Qatar Cup.

Squad list
Players and squad numbers last updated on 28 September 2022.Note: Flags indicate national team as has been defined under FIFA eligibility rules. Players may hold more than one non-FIFA nationality.

Competitions

Overview

{| class="wikitable" style="text-align: center"
|-
!rowspan=2|Competition
!colspan=8|Record
!rowspan=2|Started round
!rowspan=2|Final position / round
!rowspan=2|First match	
!rowspan=2|Last match
|-
!
!
!
!
!
!
!
!
|-
| Qatar Stars League

| Matchday 1
| To be confirmed
| 1 August 2022
| In Progress
|-
| Emir of Qatar Cup

| Round of 16
| To be confirmed
| In Progress
| In Progress
|-
| Qatar Stars Cup

| Group Stage
| To be confirmed
| In Progress
| In Progress
|-
! Total

Qatar Stars League

League table

Results summary

Results by round

Matches

Emir of Qatar Cup

Squad information

Playing statistics

|-
! colspan=16 style=background:#dcdcdc; text-align:center| Players transferred out during the season

Goalscorers

Includes all competitive matches. The list is sorted alphabetically by surname when total goals are equal.

Assists

Transfers

In

Out

Notes

References

Al Sadd SC seasons
Qatari football clubs 2022–23 season